Octavian Cuciuc (born 13 September 1977) is a Moldovan wrestler. He competed in the men's freestyle 58 kg at the 2000 Summer Olympics.

References

External links
 

1977 births
Living people
Moldovan male sport wrestlers
Olympic wrestlers of Moldova
Wrestlers at the 2000 Summer Olympics
People from Bender, Moldova
21st-century Moldovan people